Tripterococcus is a genus of flowering plants belonging to the family Celastraceae.

Its native range is Western and Southwestern Australia.

Species:
 Tripterococcus brunonis Endl.

References

Celastraceae
Celastrales genera